Alfred Kühne (14 April 1895 – 16 October 1981) was a German businessman, the son of August Kühne (1855–1932), the co-founder of Kuehne + Nagel, the global transportation and logistics company.

Alfred Kühne was born in Bremen on 14 April 1895, and took over control and ownership of Kuehne + Nagel on his father's death in 1932.

Kühne died in Lenzerheide, Switzerland on 16 October 1981, when control of the company passed to his only child, Klaus-Michael Kühne.

References

1895 births
1981 deaths
German businesspeople